Taichung Football Field, also known as Chaoma Football Field, is a football-specific venue located in Xitun District, Taichung, Taiwan. It has three 11-player football pitches, one 7-player pitch, one 5-player pitch, and three basketball courts. It is owned by Taichung City Government and presently operated by Taichung Football Commission.

Major Events
 10 January 2020 - Taichung City FC holds their first tryouts session
 17 January 2020 - Taichung City FC hold their second tryouts session

See also
 List of stadiums in Taiwan

References

Football venues in Taiwan
Buildings and structures in Taichung